The SS Columbus, was a German ocean liner laid down before the start of World War I. The vessel was originally to be named Hindenburg. However, her then-sister, originally named Columbus, was handed over to British government and then sold to the White Star Line after the war as part of reparations in 1920 and renamed Homeric by her new owners. The Allies allowed the Norddeutscher Lloyd (NDL), her owners, to keep the remaining ship. NDL decided to give her the name of her departed sister, now the British . Construction, which had been held up by the war, resumed at Schichau Shipyards in Danzig, Germany.

Construction and maiden voyage
Material shortages caused by the war delayed her completion until 1922. She made her maiden voyage in April 1924. At the time, she was the German merchant marine's largest, fastest ocean liner.

Her maximum speed was 18 knots (33 km/h; 21 mph). "She had been chartered for a number of years by Cooks Travel Agency in New York and cruised into West Indian waters about every two weeks with occasional trips around South America and Africa."

She was one of the first liners to have an outside swimming pool installed on her top deck, as well as a platform for night-time dancing. She had triple-expansion steam engines and was quite popular and convinced NDL that larger passenger liners were feasible.

Later career
In 1929, she was given a refit to make her resemble her younger, larger and faster running mates. This included the addition of two larger, much shorter smokestacks and replacement of the reciprocating engines with geared steam turbines.

She left Bremerhaven for New York on 20 June 1939.  She left New York for a West Indies cruise on 19 August 1939.  At the outbreak of World War II in September 1939, Columbus was ordered to return to Germany at once. The Royal Navy was on the lookout for enemy ships. Putting her passengers ashore at Havana, Cuba, her captain and crew sped to Veracruz, evading the British.  In early November, they received orders to attempt a blockade run to Germany.  On 14 December the Columbus departed Veracruz, escorted by seven American destroyers through the American coastal neutrality zone.

On 19 December the British destroyer  sighted Columbus about 400 miles off the coast of Virginia. The still neutral American heavy cruiser  was also in the area, and silently observed the two ships. Rather than surrender the ship, her crew scuttled her, and she burned and sank. Her passengers and crew, 576 crewmembers, including boys, stevedores and nurses, were taken aboard Tuscaloosa as rescued seamen, not as prisoners of war as they would have been had the British picked them up. Tuscaloosa took all personnel to New York City. On 18 January 1940, 512 crewmen were moved to Angel Island. In 1941, 411 German nationals from the Columbus were sent to Fort Stanton, New Mexico. At the end of war many returned to Germany.

On 11 December 1941, in a speech before the German Reichstag announcing his decision to declare war on the United States, Adolf Hitler described the presence of Tuscaloosa at the scuttling of the Columbus as a hostile act against the German nation, insisting that the American cruiser had forced the liner "into the hands of British warships". As such, Hitler listed the loss of the Columbus among the casus belli for his declaration of war.

See also
 Escape from Fort Stanton

References

External links

 The Classic Liners of Long Ago: Columbus
 SS Columbus, the largest and the fastest German ship

Ocean liners
Ships of Norddeutscher Lloyd
1922 ships
Maritime incidents in December 1939
Ships built in Danzig
Ships built by Schichau